D. António de Araújo e Azevedo, 1st Count of Barca (14 May 1754 – 21 July 1817) was a Portuguese statesman, author and amateur botanist.

Career 
After cooperating in the establishment of the Academy of Sciences in Lisbon, he represented his government in Holland, France, Prussia, and Russia.

He was first minister of John VI of Portugal, whom he followed when the Portuguese Court was transferred to the colony of Brazil in 1807. There he was minister of the navy and foreign minister, and took great interest in promoting education and industry, having established the manufacture of porcelain in Rio de Janeiro.

Works 
He conducted scientific studies and experiments in his own palace and private botanical garden, as well as the first trials for the acclimatization and culture of the tea-plant in Brazil. Later in life, he was the founder of Brazil's first school of fine arts.

As an author, his works include two tragedies and a translation of Virgil's pastorals.

References 
 
 

1754 births
1817 deaths
Ambassadors of Portugal to the Netherlands
Ambassadors of Portugal to France
Ambassadors of Portugal to Prussia
Ambassadors of Portugal to Russia
Portuguese male writers
19th-century Portuguese botanists
Government ministers of Portugal
People from Ponte de Lima
18th-century Portuguese  botanists
19th-century Portuguese writers
19th-century male writers
Counts of Barca